TMAC, T-MAC or tMAC may refer to:

 Trimellitic anhydride chloride, a chemical compound
 Testis-specific meiotic arrest complex, a protein complex in Drosophila
 TeraMAC, a unit of 1012 multiply–accumulate operations (MAC)

People
 Tony MacAlpine (1960), American musician
 Terry McAuliffe, former Governor of Virginia
 Tom McCarthy (sportscaster), Philadelphia Phillies announcer
 Tracy McGrady (born 1979), a retired professional American basketball player
 tobyMac (born 1964), Christian hip hop artist

See also
 T-Mac (disambiguation)